Jerry McMorris (October 9, 1940 – May 8, 2012) was the principal owner of the Colorado Rockies of the National League from  through . A limited partner in the ownership group that founded the Rockies in the early 1990s, he joined with meatpacking heir Charlie Monfort and Oren Benton to buy controlling interest in the team after original owner Mickey Monus was embroiled in an accounting scandal. In 2005, McMorris sold his stake of the franchise to the Charie Monfort and his brother Dick.

McMorris died on May 8, 2012 from pancreatic cancer at the age of 71 in a hospital in Aurora, Colorado.

Notes

External links
Colorado Rockies owners
McMorris sells stake in Rockies to Monfort brothers

Major League Baseball executives
Colorado Rockies executives
Colorado Rockies owners
Major League Baseball team presidents
1940 births
2012 deaths
Place of birth missing
Deaths from pancreatic cancer
Deaths from cancer in Colorado